Betsy Bobel Opyt is a Registered Dietitian, Entrepreneur, Spokesperson, and American Fitness & Fashion Model. She became Miss Indiana in 2000.  After winning, Betsy took her platform for healthy lifestyle to many schools and communities working with the Indiana Department of Education.  Betsy is the president/CEO of Betsy's Best a line of gourmet nut and seed butters featuring functional food ingredients for a unique taste and texture.  Her products can be found nationwide and she is the spokesperson for the brand.  The Betsy's Best Brand has created a scholarship for the Miss Indiana program that will give back to an organization that helped Betsy begin her career. Betsy was also named 2015 Florida's Young Mother of the Year by American Mothers Organization.

Early life

Bobel performed in the Peru Amateur Circus starting at age seven in Peru, Indiana. She performed for 11 years and starting at age 13 Betsy then became a flyer on the flying trapeze. She performed a full-twisting double somersault consecutively creating Peru Circus history.  Betsy was also crowned Miss Miami Co., Miss Circus City and then Miss Indiana State Festival Queen.  She then went on to become an Indy 500 Festival Princess before competing in the Miss Indiana America program where she was crowned Miss Indiana 2000 and competed at the Miss America Program held in Atlantic City, NJ.

Education

Betsy graduated from Maconaquah in 1995 and Ball State University in Dietetics and was a member of the Alpha Chi Omega sorority.

Family

Her sister is Bridget Bobel who won Miss Indiana in 2006 and competed for the title of Miss USA in 2006.

References

Living people
American beauty pageant winners
People from Peru, Indiana
Ball State University alumni
Year of birth missing (living people)
Miss America 2001 delegates